Gustavo Ribeiro Neves (born 23 April 2004), known as Gustavo Neves or Gustavinho, is a Brazilian footballer who plays as a forward for Red Bull Bragantino.

Club career
Born in Goiânia, Goiás, Gustavinho joined Red Bull Bragantino in 2021, from Goiás. Promoted by head coach Pedro Caixinha for the 2023 season, he made his senior debut on 18 January of that year, coming on as a half-time substitute for Sorriso in a 1–1 Campeonato Paulista away draw against São Bernardo.

Career statistics

References

External links
Red Bull Bragantino profile 

2004 births
Living people
Sportspeople from Goiânia
Brazilian footballers
Association football forwards
Red Bull Bragantino players